Clarke Tivy Rollins (October 14, 1912 – November 25, 1996) was a politician in Ontario, Canada. He was a Progressive Conservative member of the Legislative Assembly of Ontario from 1959 to 1981 who represented the ridings of Hastings East, Hastings, and Hastings—Peterborough.

Background
He was born in Coe Hill, Ontario, the son of Charles Samuel Rollins, and educated there and in Belleville. Rollins married Beverley Hurley and had three sons.  He was a freemason and his cousin, Doug Rollins, represented the neighbouring riding of Quinte as a Progressive Conservative Member of Provincial Parliament from 1995 to 1999. He died at his home in Bancroft, Ontario.

Politics
He served as reeve for Wollaston Township and warden for Hastings County. Rollins also served as chairman of the St. Lawrence Parks Commission. He was elected to the legislature in 1959 after upsetting incumbent MPP Lloyd Harrison Price for the Progressive Conservative nomination, several months after Price was acclaimed as the riding's MPP in a by-election. Rollins went on to defeat Liberal candidate Leslie McLaren in the general election by 1,897 votes. He was re-elected in five times before retiring in 1981. He served 22 years as a backbench supporter of Leslie Frost, John Robarts, and Bill Davis.

References

External links
 
 Tribute in the Legislative Assembly of Ontario, November 27, 1996 

1912 births
1996 deaths
Progressive Conservative Party of Ontario MPPs